Northern Canadian Shield taiga is a taiga ecoregion located in northern Canada, stretching from Great Bear Lake in the Northwest Territories to Hudson Bay in eastern Nunavut.  The region supports conifer forests to its northern edge, where the territory grades into tundra.  The open forest in this transition zone is characterized by widely scattered, stunted stands of black spruce (Picea mariana) and tamarack (Larix laricina), with some white spruce (Picea glauca).  The ecoregion lies over the northwestern extent of the Canadian Shield.

Location and Description
There are many lakes, with drainage trending towards Great Slave Lake. Permafrost is discontinuous to continuous.

Climate
The climate of the ecoregion is Subarctic climate, without dry season (Köppen climate classification Subarctic climate (Dfc)). This climate is characterized by mild summers (only 1-3 months above ) and cold, snowy winters (coldest month below ).  Precipitation averages 200 - 400 mm/year.

Flora and fauna
The ground cover in the ecoregion is 33% herbaceous cover, 15% shrubs, 19% open forest, 15% closed forest.  Water bodies cover 18% of the region.  The characteristic trees are black spruce (Picea mariana), tamarack (Larix laricina), and white spruce (Picea glauca).  Ground cover includes extensive dwarf birch (Betula), ericaceous shrubs (Ericaceae), cottongrass (Eriophorum), lichen and moss.  The vegetation is relatively undisturbed by human activity, with 90-95% of the region intact.

Protected areas
Approximately 8% of the ecoregion is in an officially protected area, including:
 Wood Buffalo National Park, in the southwest of the region; the largest national park in Canada.
 Thelon Wildlife Sanctuary, located at the northern edge of the ecoregion, north of the treeline.
 Baralzon Lake Ecological Reserve, in Manitoba in the southeast of the region 
 Caribou River Provincial Park, on the border between Manitoba and Nunavut, featuring boreal forests and peatlands.
 Numaykoos Lake Provincial Park, in northern Manitoba.
 Fidler-Greywillow Wildland Park, in northern Alberta on the northwest of Lake Athabasca
 Sand Lakes Provincial Park, in northern Manitoba.

See also
List of ecoregions in Canada (WWF)

References 

Ecoregions of Canada
Taiga and boreal forests
Nearctic ecoregions